Quercus acrodonta is a species of flowering plant in the oak genus Quercus, family Fagaceae, native to central and southern China. It is an evergreen tree, occasionally a shrub, reaching , most of its structures are covered in a tomentose yellowish-gray layer. It is placed in section Ilex.

References

acrodonta
Endemic flora of China
Flora of North-Central China
Flora of South-Central China
Flora of Southeast China
Plants described in 1897